This a list of the winners of the Catalan Chess Championship.

Championship winners 
{| class="sortable wikitable"
! Nr !! Year !! Men's winner
|-
|	1	||	1905	||	
|-
|	2	||	1914	||	
|-
|	3	||	1921	||	
|-
|	4	||	1923	||	
|-
|	5	||	1924	||	
|-
|	6	||	1926	||	 
|-
|	7	||	1928	||	
|-
|	8	||	1931	||	
|-
|	9	||	1933	||	
|-
|	10	||	1935	||	
|-
|	11	||	1943	||	
|-
|	12	||	1944	||	
|-
|	13	||	1945	||	
|-
|	14	||	1946	||	
|-
|	15	||	1947	||	
|-
|	16	||	1948	||	
|-
|	17	||	1949	||	
|-
|	18	||	1950	||	
|-
|	19	||	1951	||	
|-
|	20	||	1952	||	
|-
|	21	||	1953	||	
|-
|	22	||	1954	||	
|-
|	23	||	1955	||	
|-
|	24	||	1956	||	
|-
|	25	||	1957	||	
|-
|	26	||	1958	||	
|-
|	27	||	1959	||	
|-
|	28	||	1960	||	
|-
|	29	||	1961	||	
|-
|	30	||	1962	||	
|-
|	31	||	1963	||	
|-
|	32	||	1964	||	
|-
|	33	||	1965	||	
|-
|	34	||	1966	||	
|-
|	35	||	1967	||	
|-
|	36	||	1968	||	
|-
|	37	||	1969	||	
|-
|	38	||	1970	||	
|-
|	39	||	1971	||	
|-
|	40	||	1972	||	
|-
|	41	||	1973	||	
|-
|	42	||	1974	||	
|-
|	43	||	1975	||	
|-
|	44	||	1976	||	
|-
|	45	||	1977	||	
|-
|	46	||	1978	||	
|-
|	47	||	1979	||	
|-
|	48	||	1980	||	
|-
|	49	||	1981	||	
|-
|	50	||	1982	||	
|-
|	51	||	1983	||	
|-
|	52	||	1984	||	
|-
|	53	||	1985	||	
|-
|	54	||	1986	||	
|-
|	55	||	1987	||	
|-
|	56	||	1988	||	
|-
|	57	||	1989	||	
|-
|	58	||	1990	||	
|-
|	59	||	1991	||	
|-
|	60	||	1992	||	
|-
|	61	||	1992*	||	
|-
|	62	||	1993	||	
|-
|	63	||	1994	||	
|-
|	64	||	1995	||	
|-
|	65	||	1996	||	
|-
|	66	||	1997	||	
|-
|	67	||	1998	||	
|-
|	68	||	1999	||	
|-
|	69	||	2000	||	
|-
|	70	||	2001	||	
|-
|	71	||	2002	||	
|-
|	72	||	2003	||	
|-
|	73	||	2004	||	
|-
|       74      ||      2005    ||	
|-
|	75	||	2006	||	
|-
|	76	||	2007	||	
|-
|       77      ||      2008    ||      
|-
|       78      ||      2009    ||      
|-
|       79      ||      2010    ||      
|-
|       80      ||      2011    ||      
|-
|       81      ||      2012    ||      
|-
|       82      ||      2013    ||      
|-
|       83      ||      2014    ||      
|-
|       84      ||      2015    ||      
|-
|       85      ||      2016    ||
|-
|       86      ||      2017    ||      
|-
|       87      ||      2018    ||      
    
|}

Note: In 1992, two championships were held.

Women's winners 
{| class="sortable wikitable"
! Nr !! Year !! Women's winner
|-
|	1	||	1932	||	
|-
|	2	||	1933	||	
|-
|	3	||	1935	||	
|-
|	4	||	1936	||	
|-
|	5	||	1942	||	
|-
|	6	||	1943	||	
|-
|	7	||	1944	||	
|-
|	8	||	1946	||	
|-
|	9	||	1949	||	
|-
|	10	||	1951	||	
|-
|	11	||	1952	||	
|-
|	12	||	1955	||	
|-
|	13	||	1956	||	
|-
|	14	||	1957	||	
|-
|	15	||	1958	||	
|-
|	16	||	1959	||	
|-
|	17	||	1961	||	
|-
|	18	||	1963	||	
|-
|	19	||	1964	||	
|-
|	20	||	1965	||	, Maria Rosa Ribes
|-
|	21	||	1966	||	
|-
|	22	||	1967	||	
|-
|	23	||	1968	||	
|-
|	24	||	1969	||	
|-
|	25	||	1970	||	
|-
|	26	||	1971	||	
|-
|	27	||	1972	||	
|-
|	28	||	1973	||	
|-
|	29	||	1974	||	
|-
|	30	||	1975	||	
|-
|	31	||	1976	||	
|-
|	32	||	1977	||	
|-
|	33	||	1978	||	
|-
|	34	||	1979	||	
|-
|	35	||	1980	||	
|-
|	36	||	1981	||	
|-
|	37	||	1982	||	
|-
|	38	||	1983	||	
|-
|	39	||	1984	||	
|-
|	40	||	1985	||	
|-
|	41	||	1986	||	
|-
|	42	||	1987	||	
|-
|	43	||	1988	||	  
|-
|	44	||	1989	||	
|-
|	45	||	1990	||	
|-
|	46	||	1991	||	
|-
|	47	||	1992	||	
|-
|	48	||	1993	||	
|-
|	49	||	1994	||	
|-
|	50	||	1995	||	
|-
|	51	||	1996	||	
|-
|	52	||	1997	||	
|-
|	53	||	1998	||	
|-
|	54	||	1999	||	
|-
|	55	||	2000	||	
|-
|	56	||	2001	||	
|-
|	57	||	2002	||	 
|-
|	58	||	2003	||	
|-
|	59	||	2004	||	
|-
|	60	||	2005	||	
|-
|	61	||	2006	||	
|-
|	62	||	2007	||	
|-
|	63	||	2008	||	
|-
|	64	||	2009	||	 
|-
|       65      ||      2010    ||      
|-
|       66      ||      2011    ||      
|-
|       67      ||      2012    ||      
|-
|       68      ||      2013    ||      
|-
|       69      ||      2014    ||      
|-
|       70      ||      2015    ||      
|-
|       71      ||      2016    ||      
|-
|       72      ||      2017    || 
|}

References

Chess national championships
Women's chess national championships
Chess in Spain
Recurring sporting events established in 1905
1905 in chess
1905 establishments in Spain
Recurring sporting events established in 1932
1932 in chess
1932 establishments in Spain
Chess
Chess